The 2020 FC BATE Borisov season was the club's 33rd season of existence and their 23rd consecutive season in the Belarusian Premier League. BATE Borisov entered the season as the league's 10-time defending champions. Beyond the Premier League, BATE Borisov is participating in the UEFA Europa League and the Belarusian Cup. Competitive fixtures began on 9 March 2020, and the league began play on 19 March 2020.

The club's season has been highlighted by the fact that the Belarus Premier League was the only top-flight football league in UEFA to not suspend play during the COVID-19 pandemic. Worldwide, the Belarusian Premier League was one of only three top-tier football leagues, along with Nicaragua and Tajikistan, that continued play through the pandemic. Part of this has been attributed to the nation's relatively low number of positive coronavirus cases in Belarus.

Previous season 
The 2019 season was the first year since 2005 where BATE failed to win the Premier League title. Following the 2019 season, head manager, Alyaksey Baha was relieved of his duties. Ahead of the 2020 season, Kirill Alshevsky, the manager of BATE Reserves, was appointed manager.

BATE finished the 2019 season with a 22–4–4 record in league play. BATE was eliminated in the quarterfinals of the 2018–19 Belarusian Cup. BATE continued their participation in the 2018–19 UEFA Europa League knockout phase, where they were pitted against English outfit, and eventual runners-up, Arsenal. BATE won the home leg 1–0, but lost away 0–3, ending their Europa League participation. During the late summer, BATE resumed European competition play by entering in the second qualifying round of the 2019–20 UEFA Champions League. BATE were eliminated by Norwegian side, Rosenborg in the second round, transferring to the 2019–20 UEFA Europa League's third qualifying round. BATE advanced to the play-off round after defeating Bosnian side, Sarajevo, but lost to Kazakh side, FC Astana, thus ending their European participation for the 2019 season. 

Since BATE finished in 2nd last season the Premier League, they will enter in the qualifying rounds of the 2020–21 UEFA Europa League, which is slated to begin for them in July.

Non-competitive fixtures

Competitive fixtures

Belarusian Premier League

Table

Results

Belarusian Cup (2019–20)

Quarterfinals

Semifinals

Final

Belarusian Cup (2020–21)

UEFA Europa League

Qualifying rounds

Squad

Transfers

Transfers in

Transfers out

Loan out

Statistics

Appearances and goals

|-
|colspan="14"|Players away from BATE on loan:
|-

|}

Goal-scorers

References

External links 
 FC BATE Borisov

Belarusian football clubs 2020 season
2016
BATE Borisov